Schimke is a surname of:

 Jana Schimke (born 1979), German politician (CDU) 
 Karin Schimke (born 1968), South African writer
 Peter Schimke (1960-2020), American piano player, songwriter, composer, session musician and producer
 Robert Schimke (1932–2014), American biochemist